Amec Foster Wheeler plc was a British multinational consultancy, engineering and project management company headquartered in London, United Kingdom. In October 2017, it was acquired by Wood Group.

It was focused on the Oil, Gas & Chemicals, Mining, Power & Process and Environment & Infrastructure markets, with offices in over 55 countries worldwide. Roughly a third of its turnover came from Europe, half from North America and 12% from the rest of the world.

Amec Foster Wheeler shares were publicly traded on the London Stock Exchange and its American Depositary Shares were traded on the New York Stock Exchange.

History
Amalgamated Mechanical Engineering and Construction (AMEC) was formed from the 1982 amalgamation of Leonard Fairclough & Son (founded 1883) and the William Press Group (founded 1913). In 1988, AMEC went on to acquire Matthew Hall Group. In 1996, AMEC took a 40% stake in Spie Batignolles from Schneider in association with a management buyout. Amec launched the AMEC SPIE brand for engineering services in Europe, a rail construction business AMEC Spie Rail was created, and the remaining construction business was retained as Spie Batignolles. The company announced that it would seek to sell the construction arm of the business Spie Batignolles, and entered negotiations to secure a management buyout of that division; the management buyout of the construction arm of Spie was completed in September 2003 with the aid of Barclays Private Equity Finance and later that year Amec took full control of the remaining parts of Spie.

Acquisitions in the new millennium included Ogden Environmental & Energy Services and AGRA Monenco Inc., a North American engineering and services company, both in 2000 as well as the U.S. operations and equipment of Lauren Kamtech in 2003. Then in 2004, AMEC was awarded a contract to assist in the reconstruction effort in Iraq, as part of a joint venture with Fluor Corp.

In 2005, AMEC acquired UK-based NNC, a large nuclear consulting company and its subsidiaries, including Ontario-based Nuclear Safety Solutions ('NSS'), the nuclear safety division of OPG, which was spun off when OPG was privatised. The European engineering business, AMEC SPIE, was sold to PAI Partners for €1,040 million in 2006 and the European rail business joint venture Amec Spie Rail systems was sold for an estimated £200million in 2007, to Colas Group.

In 2007, AMEC purchased UK environmental consultancy Applied Environmental Research Centre (AERC), providers of environmental science, planning engineering and monitoring services, and sold its UK construction arm to Morgan Sindall.  In 2008, it sold its internal plant hire division to Speedy Hire before buying project services company Rider Hunt International, North American environmental consulting firm Geomatrix Consultants, Inc., and Slovakian nuclear services company AllDeco. In 2009, AMEC acquired Performance Improvement Group, Journeaux, Bedard & Associates and GRD Limited and in 2010, it continued to expand with the £61.2 m purchase of Entec UK, one of the UK's largest Environmental Consultancies. GRD Ltd. was a Perth-based company incorporating three companies Global Renewables, GRD Minproc, and Kirfield. AMEC also acquired Australian-based businesses Currie and Brown (Australia) and BurmanGriffiths and acquired a majority stake in S2V Consulting.

In 2011, the company acquired US-based BCI Engineers & Scientists, Inc., MACTEC, a US-based engineering consultancy company, and Zektin Group, an Australian-based specialist engineering consultancy for the oil and gas and resources industries.

In January 2014, AMEC provisionally agreed a £1.9bn takeover of Swiss rival Foster Wheeler. AMEC completed its purchase of Foster Wheeler on 13 November 2014 and changed its name to Amec Foster Wheeler plc.

In 2015, the company tried to change its focus to deal with the decline in oil process.

The acquisition of Foster Wheeler coincided with a downturn in revenues from the oil and gas sectors, its primary clients, leading to crippling debt. The resultant financial difficulties led to the company's chief executive Samir Brikho stepping down in January 2016.

In March 2017, Wood Group announced it would acquire the company for £2.2 billion. In October 2017, the transaction was completed.

Operations

Amec Foster Wheeler employed over 40,000 people in more than 55 countries, including Afghanistan, Australia, Azerbaijan, Brazil, Canada, Chile, China, India, Kuwait, Qatar, Peru, Poland, Turkey and the United States. The company had three geographic business units covering engineering and project delivery operations—Americas; Northern Europe & Commonwealth of Independent States; Asia, Middle East, Africa & Southern Europe—and one power equipment business unit operating worldwide - The Global Power Group.

AMEC's operations were structured until October 2012 into Natural Resources, Power & Process and Environment & Infrastructure.

AMEC's UK construction business was sold in 2007. Amongst its notable projects were: the Kielder Dam completed in 1982, the Cumberland Infirmary completed in 2001, the M6 Toll completed in 2003, new offices for HM Revenue and Customs at Longbenton completed in 2005, the Docklands Light Railway City Airport extension completed in 2005, the University College London Hospital completed in 2005 and the New York Times Building completed in 2007.

Charity
Amec Foster Wheeler supported children's charity SOS Children's Villages from 2007, funding educational projects in Asia. Amec Foster Wheeler also funded a green project in the Children's Village in Gwagwalada, Nigeria, enabling houses to become self-sufficient following the installation of solar power and water infrastructure.

References

External links

2014 establishments in the United Kingdom
2017 disestablishments in England
2017 mergers and acquisitions
Companies formerly listed on the London Stock Exchange
Companies formerly listed on the New York Stock Exchange
Consulting firms established in 1982